Ashok Bendalam is an Indian politician from Andhra Pradesh. He is elected as the Member of the Legislative Assembly (MLA) representing the Ichchapuram Assembly constituency from the Telugu Desam Party (TDP) since 2014.

Political career 
Bendalam acted as the in-charge for TDP in Ichchapuram. In the 2014 and 2019 elections, he won as the MLA from TDP representing the Ichchapuram Assembly constituency.

References

External links 

Telugu people
People from Srikakulam district
Telugu Desam Party politicians
Andhra Pradesh MLAs 2014–2019
Andhra Pradesh MLAs 2019–2024
Living people
Year of birth missing (living people)